Kabir Singh is a 2019 Indian Hindi-language romantic drama film written and directed by Sandeep Reddy Vanga and jointly produced by Bhushan Kumar and Krishan Kumar under T-Series Films and Murad Khetani and Ashwin Varde under Cine1 Studios. A remake of Vanga's own Telugu film Arjun Reddy (2017), it stars Shahid Kapoor in the titular role as a surgeon who spirals into self-destruction when his girlfriend, Preeti, played by Kiara Advani, marries someone else. Adil Hussain, Nikita Dutta, Arjan Bajwa, Suresh Oberoi, Dolly Minhas, Suparna Marwah, Anurag Arora, Soham Majumdar, Kunal Thakur, Anusha Sampath, Amit Sharma and Kamini Kaushal feature in supporting roles.

Principal photography for Kabir Singh began in October 2018 and ended in March 2019. The film was theatrically released in India on 21 June 2019 and received mixed reviews with criticism directed at it glamorising misogyny and toxic masculinity, though Kapoor's performance and the soundtrack, which has become popular since release, received acclaim.  Grossing over 370 crore, it became the third highest grossing Bollywood film of 2019, and Kapoor's highest grossing solo-lead release. It became the 26th highest grossing Indian film of all time.

Plot 
Kabir Rajdheer Singh, a house surgeon at the Delhi Institute of Medical Sciences, suffers from severe anger management problems that gain him the reputation of a bully. After a brawl, Kabir is told to either apologize or leave, but chooses to stays upon catching sight of a new student, Preeti Sikka.

Later, Kabir and his friends announce to the student body that Kabir has exclusively claimed Preeti. Initially timid, she adjusts to his overbearing attitude and eventually reciprocates his feelings, developing an intimate relationship with him. Kabir graduates with an MBBS degree and moves to Mussoorie for post-graduation. Despite the distance, their relationship strengthens over the next few years. After Preeti graduates, she introduces Kabir to her conservative parents, but her father Harpal catches them kissing and throws Kabir out.

Harpal continues to oppose their relationship, despite Kabir's attempts to explain their love. Enraged, Kabir demands that Preeti choose between him and her family within the next six hours, or he will end their relationship. Preeti fails to reach back to him in time; feeling abandoned, Kabir injects himself with morphine and remains unconscious for the next two days. Upon gaining consciousness, he learns that Preeti is being forced into an arranged marriage and gatecrashes the wedding party; Harpal has him beaten and arrested. After Kabir is released, his father, Rajdheer, ostracises him from the family for his antics.

With his friend Shiva’s help, Kabir finds a rented flat and joins a private hospital as a surgeon. To cope with his emotions, he abuses drugs and alcohol, attempts one-night stands, has casual relationships, and names his new pet dog Preeti — none of which are successful. Within months, he becomes a successful surgeon and a high-functioning alcoholic both respected and feared by the hospital staff. His self-destructive behaviour and obsession worry his friends.

While hungover on a day-off, Kabir is called in to perform an emergency surgery for which he unwillingly agrees. During the procedure, he collapses from dehydration. Suspicious, the hospital staff takes his blood samples, which contain traces of alcohol and cocaine. A case is filed against him and during an in-house hearing, a broken Kabir admits to alcoholism and violation of medical ethics. As a result, his medical license is suspended for five years and he is evicted from his flat. The next morning, he learns of his grandmother’s death; at the funeral, he and his father reconcile. Kabir also resolves to quit his habits.

Some days later, Kabir spots a pregnant but dejected Preeti sitting in a park. He approaches and offers to raise the child with her if she is unhappy in her marriage. Initially silent, she bursts into angry tears, yells at him for discarding her, and ordering him to leave. Shiva then describes Kabir's obsession and self-destructive habits, which she was unaware of. Shocked, she confesses that she left her husband three days after the marriage and has been working in a clinic to support herself. Overcome with anger, especially after hearing about his casual affairs, she had refused to contact him. She reveals that her marriage was never consummated and that the child is Kabir’s. They marry and reunite with their families, with Harpal apologizing to them and the families coming together. The film ends with them on their honeymoon, on a beach, with their baby.

Cast

Production

Development 
After the success of his debut, the 2017 Telugu film Arjun Reddy, writer and director Sandeep Reddy Vanga wanted to remake it in Hindi with Ranveer Singh. When it did not work out, he approached Shahid Kapoor. However, producers Murad Khetani and Ashwin Varde of Cine1 Studios, who acquired the remake rights for Hindi, wanted Arjun Kapoor to play the male lead. Disappointed, Vanga said, "I've come to know that the remake rights of Arjun Reddy have been sold and it would star Arjun Kapoor. I am caught in a dilemma, as I've already locked Shahid for the role. It's a very embarrassing situation for me. I don't know how I'll face Shahid." In April 2018, however, it was officially announced that Shahid Kapoor would star, with Vanga returning as director.

Bhushan and Krishan Kumar of T-Series also produced the film. The dialogue was written by Siddharth–Garima. Santhana Krishnan Ravichandran was selected as the cinematographer and Aarif Sheikh as editor. Vanga was confident that the remake would be even more hard-hitting than the original: "When I made Arjun Reddy, I wasn't sure where to draw the line in terms of representation of certain things. I don't think I'd have to restrict myself when it comes to the Hindi version. I believe I'll have more freedom in Bollywood." The film's title Kabir Singh was announced on 25 October 2018.

Writing 
Like the Telugu original, Kabir Singh too begins with a voiceover from the hero's paternal grandmother, but this time she is reciting a Kabir Doha. There are also geographical changes; the remake is set primarily in Delhi and Mumbai. Instead of caste conflict as in Arjun Reddy, the heroine's father takes offence to Kabir's smoking and not being a turban-wearing Sikh. For the remake, Vanga said he deployed less English than the original. "I've also tried to retain the colloquial quality in the Hindi dialogue." About the name Kabir Singh, he said, "There's a lot of melancholy in the name Kabir and a poetic side too." Vanga explained his reasons for choosing this as the film's title: "When we started work on the Hindi script, it was a very exciting journey. Kabir Singh, as the protagonist's name, came naturally, considering the character's graph. Kabir Singh has the same punch and madness of Arjun Reddy."

Casting 

Shahid Kapoor portrays the title character, Kabir Rajdheer Singh. Although Kiara Advani was Vanga's first choice for the female lead character Preeti, things failed to materialise. Tara Sutaria was then announced, but left when a delay in the production of her debut film Student of the Year 2 (2019) caused scheduling conflicts. The makers then went back to Advani to play the role of Preeti, Vanga cited her performance in M.S. Dhoni: The Untold Story (2016) as one of the reasons. According to Vanga, "Kiara epitomises the female character in the film to the T. She has the perfect combination of innocence (in terms of looks) and maturity (in terms of performance) that's so important for the character". Arjan Bajwa was initially uninterested in playing Kabir's elder brother Karan Singh, but accepted at the insistence of Vanga, for whom he was the only choice to play the character. Amit Sharma, who appeared as Amit in the Telugu original, was chosen to reprise his role.

Filming 
The makers considered beginning the shoot in August, but it was delayed to September as Vanga wanted Kapoor to grow his beard more for the role. Principal photography eventually began on 21 October 2018 at Mumbai, four days before the announcement of the title. Filming also took place at Delhi and Mussoorie. Kapoor dons three different looks for the film. Regarding this he said, "There's a certain mind space and the present which the character is in and there's also the past which he has been part of. Along with this, there's the culmination. So, there are three distinct energies that the film needs." He went through substantial workouts to portray Kabir in two time periods; to achieve the character's "college boy" look, he shed 14 kilos of weight, and for the "puffy, groggy alcoholic" look, he worked out in a way that he would look "bigger but not muscular". Principal photography wrapped on 29 March 2019.

Soundtrack 

The soundtrack is composed by Mithoon, Amaal Mallik, Vishal Mishra, Sachet–Parampara (a duo consisting of Sachet Tandon and Parampara Thakur) and Akhil Sachdeva with lyrics written by Irshad Kamil, Manoj Muntashir, Kumaar and Mithoon. Harshavardhan Rameshwar composed the score. The song "Bekhayali" was popular even before its release, with several cover versions available on YouTube.

Marketing 
In a first-of-its-kind marketing deal, Kabir Singh became the first Bollywood film to have its very own theatre. As many as 15 PVR theatres in 15 cities across India would be renamed as "Kabir Singh Ka Theatre", with auditoriums reflecting the characteristics of the title character played by Kapoor.

Release 
Kabir Singh was released on 21 June 2019, worldwide on 3616 screens including 3123 screens in India. It is distributed by AA Films within India. Khetani chose not to release the film in Pakistan, following the 2019 Pulwama attack. The film received an 'A' (adults only) certificate from the Central Board of Film Certification (CBFC) with the CBFC asking the makers to modify a scene where a character is seen snorting drugs, and also asked for insertion of static warning messages against drug abuse in all such scenes.

Reception

Critical response 
The film received mixed reviews, with criticism directed at it for glamorising misogyny and toxic masculinity. Ronak Kotecha of The Times of India rated the film 3.5 out of 5 stars, saying, "While Kabir Singh is a welcome change from stereotypical love stories, this kind of love affair needs some getting used to. Through his protagonist, Sandeep bets all his cards on his leading man, making sure you either love him or hate him, but you can't ignore him." Trade analyst and critic Taran Adarsh concurred with Kotecha on the film being an unconventional story and rated it three and half stars out of five. Declaring it "powerful", he praised Vanga's storytelling and Kapoor's performance. He felt that the film was a newfangled romantic tale.

Anna M. M. Vetticad of Firstpost found the film "insidious" in its writing of the protagonist and wrote, "Kabir Singh and its Telugu forebear Arjun Reddy must rank among the most disturbing examples of the obsessive stalker hero being glamourised by Indian cinema." Rating the film 1 out of 5 stars, she further elaborated that "it is not the depiction of reality that is objectionable here, it is precisely because violent, destructive misogynists do exist and women for centuries have suffered at their hands that it is deeply troubling when a film portrays such a person as cool, funny, and, as Kapoor puts it, a man with 'a good heart' who 'loves purely' and 'wears his emotions on his sleeve'." Rajeev Masand of News 18 gave the film 2 out of 5 stars and said, "Kabir Singh is an unmistakably misogynistic film, but the sad part is that it's exactly these troubling portions that the filmmakers peddle as intense love." Priyanka Sinha Jha of News18, praising Kapoor's performance, Vanga's story and direction, rated the film with three and a half stars out of five. She found editing and soulful music of the film appealing. She felt that the film was a rare story of star-crossed lovers which moves the audience. In the end, She says, "Reddy despite a brooding despairing protagonist takes things many notches higher and makes it one helluva trippy ride." Devesh Sharma of Filmfare said, "At 172 minutes, the film is too long by modern standards. Thankfully, Vanga has gone for a non-linear mode of storytelling and going back and forth in the timeline does keep the viewer engrossed."

Shubhra Gupta of The Indian Express giving the film one-and-a-half stars out of five, opined, "Kabir Singh (protagonist) is all flourish, mostly surface. You see him going through the motions, but you never really feel for him. And that, right there, is the problem: not enough pay off for three hours of pain.". Raja Sen of Hindustan Times, agreeing with Gupta, gave one-and-a-half stars out of five and felt that it was the most misogynistic Indian film that had come in a long time. He praised the cinematography of Santhana Krishnan Ravichandran but criticised the other aspects of the film. He said, "Kabir Singh actually applauds its pathetic protagonist, and ends up an obnoxious celebration of toxic masculinity." Kunal Guha of Mumbai Mirror rated the film two-and-a-half stars out of five, feeling that trimming the script by forty minutes would have helped.

Sandipan Sharma, writing for The Federal, praised and defended the film, saying, "filmmakers should have the right to explore the mind of a flawed person." He slammed critics for accusing the film of "glorifying misogyny, portraying toxic masculinity, obsessive love, celebrating alcoholism, etc." He further added "If Kabir Singh were to inspire Indian men to turn into alcoholics, raging maniacs, would it be safe to assume that in a few years we'd see a full generation of youngsters inspired by biopics and our prime minister? [...] his tragi-comic story is so entertaining. Somewhere deep down it also reminds us of our own struggles, failures and flaws." Arnab Banerjee of Deccan Chronicle also rated the film 1.5 out of 5 stars, criticising it for misogyny but praising the performances of the supporting cast members including Majumdar, Bajwa, Dutta and Oberoi.

In response to criticism that Kabir Singh glorifies its eponymous hero's misogyny, Kapoor defended the character, saying, "There are all kinds of people in real life, including alpha-males who feel territorial entitlement, and I have played this character truthfully".

Box office 
Kabir Singhs opening day domestic collection was 20.21 crore. This is the highest opening day collection for a Shahid Kapoor film. On the second day, the film collected 22.71 crore. On the third day, the film collected 27.91 crore.

, with a gross of 331.24 crore in India and 47.78 crore overseas, the film has a worldwide gross collection of 379.2 crore.

Kabir Singh is the fourth highest grossing Bollywood film of 2019. Going by domestic net collection, the film has made it to 10th position in the list of Hindi films with highest domestic net collection. It also became the first A-certified Indian film to gross over  200 crore in India.

Home media 
The film became available as VOD on Netflix on 19 September 2019.

Awards and nominations

References

External links 
 
 

 

2010s Hindi-language films
2019 films
2019 romantic drama films
Films about alcoholism
Films about depression
Films about surgeons
Films set in Delhi
Films set in Mumbai
Films shot in Mumbai
Hindi remakes of Telugu films
Indian nonlinear narrative films
Indian romantic drama films
Medical-themed films
T-Series (company) films